This is a list of railway towns.

Australia
Cook, South Australia
Ivanhoe, New South Wales
Junee, New South Wales
Korong Vale, Victoria
Peterborough, South Australia
Serviceton, Victoria
Seymour, Victoria
Shepparton, Victoria
Werris Creek, New South Wales

Canada
Under the provisions of the Dominion Lands Act of 1872, the railway companies had the power to survey new townsites along their rail lines, throughout Western Canada.  Virtually every community in Western Canada that was created after 1870 (the majority) was directly created by the rail companies.  One company, the Grand Trunk Pacific, actually began naming the new towns along its main line in alphabetical order from east to west, demonstrating the arbitrary nature of their planning powers.

Czech Republic
 Česká Třebová - This town in Eastern Bohemia has been an important settlement for more than seven centuries but since 1849 it became a large railway hub where main lines connecting Bohemia and Moravia meet. The largest rail yard in that country is located there as well as maintenance and scrap works.
 České Velenice - The settlement was developed around an engine depot and railway works located on halfway between Vienna and Prague. Originally a suburb of Austrian town of Gmünd, the railway junction with its hinterland was attached to newly created Czechoslovakia after World War I and became a town of its own. 
 Kralupy nad Vltavou - Since Middle Ages Kralupy was a tiny insignificant village on the Vltava River. Since the 1850s it became an important railway junction and centre of petrochemical industry.

Denmark
 Langå
 Aars
 Hvalpsund
 Brønderslev
 Struer
 Silkeborg
 Herning
 Skjern
 Esbjerg
 Bramming
 Faxe

Finland
 Espoo, now the second largest town in Finland
 Hyvinkää
 Karis
 Kouvola
 Lahti
 Riihimäki

France
 Sotteville-lès-Rouen, Seine-Maritime Department
 Tergnier, Aisne Department

Germany
 Altenbeken
 Bebra
 Falkenberg/Elster
 Hamm

Hong Kong
Sha Tin
Tai Po
Heng Fa Chuen 
Tung Chung
LOHAS Park

Italy
Ardore Marina
Africo Nuovo
Allerona Scalo
Alviano Scalo
Baschi Scalo
Campoleone
Camucia
Capalbio Scalo
Catanzaro Lido
Chieti Scalo
Chiusi Scalo
Civitanova Marche
Corigliano Scalo
Fabro Scalo
Latina Scalo
Locri
Maccarese Scalo
Marina di Caulonia
Marina di Gioiosa Ionica
Marina di Sant'Ilario dello Ionio
Metaponto
Nova Siri Scalo
Orbetello Scalo
Orte Scalo
Orvieto Scalo
Palizzi Marina
Passo Corese
Poggio Mirteto Scalo
Riace Marina
Rossano Scalo
Scarlino Scalo
Sezze Scalo
Sibari
Stimigliano Scalo
Terontola

Jordan
  Jordan Hejaz Railway Corporation
Mafraq
Amman
Ma'an

Japan
Japanese National Railways (JNR) had chosen 12 major railway towns officially. The list below shows the official railway towns, but there are many other towns where town officials and residents think their town as a railway town.

 Iwamizawa, Hokkaidō - Iwamizawa engine depot and center of coal transport in Hokkaido.
 Oiwake, Hokkaidō - now part of Abira, Hokkaidō - Oiwake engine depot and another center of coal transport in Hokkaido.
 Tsuchizaki - part of Akita, Akita, Tsuchizaki engine depot and Tsuchizaki railway works.
 Niitsu, Niigata - now part of Niigata, Niigata. Junction of Shinetsu Main Line and Uetsu Main Line, Niitsu engine depot and Niitsu railway works.
 Ōmiya, Saitama - now a part of Saitama City. Junction of Tōhoku Main Line and Takasaki Line, Omiya railway works and Omiya marshalling yard.
 Maibara, Shiga - Junction of Tōkaidō Main Line and Hokuriku Main Line, Maibara engine depot and Maibara marshalling yard.
 Suita, Osaka - Suita marshalling yard, which was the largest marshalling yard in Japan.
 Tadotsu, Kagawa - Junction of Yosan Line and Dosan Line, Tadotsu railway works.
 Yonago, Tottori - Goto railway works.
 Tsuwano, Shimane - Tsuwano engine depot.
 Nōgata, Fukuoka - Center of coal transport for Chikuho coalfield.
 Tosu, Saga - Junction of Kagoshima Main Line and Nagasaki Main Line, Tosu engine depot and Tosu marshalling yard.

Malaysia
 Gemas, Negeri Sembilan - interchange between the electric line the East Coast line and the line to Johor Bahru and Singapore
 Pulau Sebang, Melaka - one of two railway stations in Melaka, forming a conurbation with Tampin, Negeri Sembilan across the border
 Batang Melaka, Melaka
 Sungai Buloh, Selangor - home to Malaysia's largest leprosarium
 Port Swettenham, Selangor - Malaysia's principal port
 Tanjong Malim, Perak - southernmost station in Perak state, last station of the Port Swettenham Komuter line
 Ipoh, Perak - capital of Perak state, former tin mining centre
 Taiping, Perak - Malaya's first railway line, former tin mining area
 Padang Besar, Perlis - northernmost station of the Malayan Railways network, on the border with Thailand
 Kuala Lipis, Pahang - former capital of Pahang
 Kuala Krai and Dabong, Kelantan
 Tumpat, Kelantan - last station of the East Coast branch line
 Segamat, Johor
 Kluang, Johor
 Tenom, Sabah - last station on the North Borneo Railway, the only railway in Borneo

Netherlands
 Ede

Poland
 Chabówka
 Fosowskie
 Herby Nowe
 Koluszki
 Węgliniec
 Zbąszynek
 Zduńska Wola Karsznice

Russia
 Novosibirsk, now the 3rd largest city in Russia

Sweden
 Hallsberg
 Nässjö, at the expense of the—at the time—larger town of Eksjö

Thailand
 Nakhon Ratchasima, Used to be the terminus for almost 30 years (1900 - 1930)
 Hatyai, The city was founded after SRT built the Hatyai Junction and it became a Financial Center of Southern Thailand.

Turkmenistan

 Bereket city is originally a typical railway town. The Bereket railway station was built in 1885 followed by building Bereket city which is now an important crossroad of the Trans-Caspian Railway and North-South Transnational Railway.

United Kingdom

 Ashford, Kent
 Battersea - now part of London; location of Clapham Junction
 Craven Arms
 Crewe
 Darlington
 Didcot
 Doncaster
 Eastleigh
 Newton Abbot - site of Great Western Railway
 Rugby, Warwickshire
 Sheringham
 Shildon
 Swindon
 Toton
 Willesden, together with Harlesden - now part of London
 Wolverton
 York

United States

Brazil

Bangladesh
Pahartali, Chittagong
Saidpur, Nilphamari

India
Adra, West Bengal
Arakkonam, Tamil Nadu
Arsikere, Karnataka
Asansol, West Bengal
Bangarapet, Karnataka
Bhusawal, Maharashtra
Bina, Madhya Pradesh
Birur, Karnataka
Chakradharpur, Jharkhand
Chengalpattu, Tamil Nadu
Chittaranjan, West Bengal
Dindigul, Tamil Nadu
Erode, Tamil Nadu
Itarsi, Madhya Pradesh
Irugur, Tamil Nadu
Jamalpur, Bihar
Jolarpettai, Tamil Nadu
Karaikudi, Tamil Nadu
Karur, Tamil Nadu
Katni, Madhya Pradesh
Katpadi, Tamil Nadu
Kharagpur, West Bengal
Manamadurai, Tamil Nadu
Mayiladuthurai, Tamil Nadu
Mughalsarai, Uttar Pradesh
Nidamangalam, Tamil Nadu
Olavakkode, Palakkad, Kerala
Peralam, Tamil Nadu
Pollachi, Tamil Nadu
Shoranur, Kerala
Thiruthuraipoondi, Tamil Nadu
Thiruvarur, Tamil Nadu
Vanchi Maniyachchi, Tamil Nadu
Villupuram, Tamil Nadu
Virudunagar, Tamil Nadu
Vriddachalam, Tamil Nadu

Spain
There are different kinds of railway towns in Spain:
 Railway towns: new creation settlements which have community services (medical service, school, church...)
 Railway villages:  new creation settlements which have no community services.
 Railway neighborhoods: settlements which appeared near a formerly town.

Some of them can be partial, non-entire. It means that railway activity was not the only one; it coexisted with other economic activities such as mining industry, cargo trade or customs activity.

Railway towns
 Almorchón, Cabeza del Buey, Province of Badajoz
 Linares-Baeza, Linares, Province of Jaén
 Fuente del Arco's station, Fuente del Arco, Province of Badajoz
 Moreda's station, Morelábor, Province of Granada
 La Encina, Villena, Province of Alicante
 Monfragüe's station (Plasencia-Empalme until middle 1970s; Palazuelo-Empalme until 27 May 1990), Malpartida de Plasencia, Province of Cáceres
 Bobadilla's station, Antequera, Province of Málaga
 Vadollano, Linares, Province of Jaén
 Espelúy's station, Espelúy, Province of Jaén
 Algodor, Aranjuez, Community of Madrid
 Arroyo-Malpartida, Cáceres, Province of Cáceres
 Chinchilla's station, Chinchilla de Monte-Aragón, Province of Albacete
 Puente de los Fierros, Lena, Asturias
 Maçanet-Massanes (formerly Empalme), Maçanet de la Selva and Massanes, Province of Girona

Partial railway towns
 Los Rosales (Tocina-Empalme until 1 August 1914), Tocina, Province of Seville
 Villanueva del Río y Minas, Province of Seville
 Canfranc's station, Canfranc, Province of Huesca
 Sierra Menera, Ojos Negros, Province of Teruel
 Barruelo de Santullán, Province of Palencia
 Venta de Baños, Province of Palencia
 Portbou, Province of Girona
 Prat del Pinter, Ogassa, Province of Girona
 Castejón, Navarre
 Valencia de Alcántara's station, Valencia de Alcántara, Province of Cáceres

Railway villages
 Doña María-Ocaña, Las Tres Villas, Province of Almería
 Nacimiento's station, Nacimiento, Province of Almería
 Roda de Barà's station, Roda de Barà, Province of Tarragona
 Calasparra's station, Calasparra, Region of Murcia

Partial railway villages
 Puerto La Laja, El Granado, Province of Huelva
 Mengíbar-Las Palomeras, Jabalquinto, Province of Jaén
 Agramón's station, Hellín, Province of Albacete
 Aljucén's station (Lavaderos until 15 April 1884; Puente de Aljucén until 1928), Mérida, Province of Badajoz

Railway neighborhoods
 Belmez's station, Bélmez, Province of Córdoba (Spain)
 Los Prados, Málaga, Province of Málaga
 La Almozara, Zaragoza, Province of Zaragoza
 Astorga-San Andrés, Astorga, Province of León
 Torralba's station, Medinaceli, Province of Soria
 Móra La Nova's station, Móra la Nova, Province of Tarragona
 Vicálvaro's station, Madrid, Community of Madrid
 Villabona's station, Llanera, Asturias

Partial railway neighborhoods
 Santa Fe-Alhama, Santa Fe de Mondújar, Province of Almería
 Serón's station, Serón, Province of Almería
 Guadix's station, Guadix, Province of Granada
 Sant Vicenç de Calders' station, El Vendrell, Province of Tarragona
 Las Matas, Las Rozas de Madrid, Community of Madrid
 Puerto de Sagunto, Sagunto, Province of Valencia
 Aldea Moret, Cáceres, Province of Cáceres

Portugal
 Entroncamento, Santarém District
 Pinhal Novo, concelho de Palmela, Setúbal District

References

Towns
Railway